Since its formation, the Swiss Air Force has used a number of different aircraft.

Aircraft

Current inventory

Retired

References

Swiss Air Force
Swiss Air Force

Swiss military-related lists